Songs of Love is a compilation album by Simply Red in 2010. It is the band’s second romantic-themed compilation following the release of It’s Only Love in 2000. It peaked at #12 in the United Kingdom and was certified silver.

The album features two new recordings "Beside You" and "I Have The Love". "Beside You" is a remake of the original recording from 1998 by Mick Hucknall for the soundtrack of the film "What Dreams May Come". "Ev'ry Time We Say Goodbye"  is the re-recorded version from the album "Simplified".

Review
James Christopher Monger from AllMusic gave the album 3 ½ stars out of 5, saying “This 2010 collection from Simply Red focuses on the group’s romantic side. [The album was] released to coincide with their farewell world tour".

Track listing 
 "Say You Love Me"	 – 3:48
 "You Make Me Feel Brand New" – 5:05
 "Stars" – 4:11
 "You've Got It"	 – 3:59
 "For Your Babies" – 4:20
 "If You Don't Know Me By Now" – 3:30
 "It's You"	 – 3:22
 "Beside You" – 4:37
 "Holding Back the Years" – 4:14
 "Smile" – 3:13
 "I Have The Love" – 3:13
 "Ev'ry Time We Say Goodbye" – 3:06

Charts

Certifications

References

2010 compilation albums
Simply Red albums